Princess Lalla Nuzha  (29 October 1940 – 2 September 1977) was a sister of the late King Hassan II of Morocco, and daughter of King Mohammed V of Morocco and his second wife, Lalla Abla bint Tahar.

Biography 
At the Dar al-Makhzin in Rabat, on 29 October 1964 (her birthday), she was married to Ahmed Osman (born at Oujda on 3 January 1930), Secretary General Ministry of National Defence (1959–1961), Ambassador to Federal Republic of Germany (1961–1962), and the United States (1967–1972), Under Secretary Ministry of Mines and Industry (1962–1964), President of the Moroccan General Navigation Company (1964–1967), Prime Minister of Morocco (1972–1979), President of the National Rally of Independents (RNI) since 1977, President of the National Assembly (1984–1992).

They had an only son: Moulay Nawfal Osman.

During Ramadan, she died in a car crash near Tétouan.

Honours
 Dame Grand Cordon of the Order of the Throne (Kingdom of Morocco).

References

20th-century Moroccan women
1940 births
1977 deaths
Daughters of kings
Moroccan princesses
Moroccan exiles in Madagascar
Road incident deaths in Morocco